This is a list of films which have placed number one at the weekend box office in Ecuador during 2012.

References
 

2012 in Ecuador
2012
Ecuador